In enzymology, a discadenine synthase is an enzyme that catalyzes the chemical reaction

S-adenosyl-L-methionine + N6-(Delta2-isopentenyl)-adenine  5'-methylthioadenosine + discadenine

Thus, the two substrates of this enzyme are S-adenosyl-L-methionine and N6-(Delta2-isopentenyl)-adenine, whereas its two products are 5'-methylthioadenosine and discadenine.

This enzyme belongs to the family of transferases, specifically those transferring aryl or alkyl groups other than methyl groups.  The systematic name of this enzyme class is S-adenosyl-L-methionine:N6-(Delta2-isopentenyl)-adenine 3-(3-amino-3-carboxypropyl)-transferase. Other names in common use include discadenine synthetase, S-adenosyl-L-methionine:6-N-(Delta2-isopentenyl)-adenine, and 3-(3-amino-3-carboxypropyl)-transferase.

References

 

EC 2.5.1
Enzymes of unknown structure